Saunders Point is an unincorporated community in Anne Arundel County, Maryland, United States.

Schools 
 Mayo Elementary School
 Central Elementary School
 Central Middle School
 South River High School

References

External links
 Saunders Point Citizens Association

Unincorporated communities in Anne Arundel County, Maryland
Unincorporated communities in Maryland